The Georgian–Polish alliance was a short-lived alliance (1920–1921) between the Democratic Republic of Georgia and the Second Polish Republic.

History
Georgia had gained its independence following the 1917 Russian Revolution; Poland, a year later, following World War I. Both countries had a history of problematic relations with their Russian neighbor. Polish leader Józef Piłsudski wanted to create a large East-European Międzymorze federation for common defense. He saw Georgia as a possible candidate for such an alliance.

Plans for a Polish diplomatic mission to the Caucasus, to the new countries of Georgia, Armenia and Azerbaijan, had been laid as early as April 1918 but began to be realized only in March 1920. By that time, a Polish brigade (Polska Oddzielna Brygada) had been formed of the Polish soldiers of the Russian army serving in the Caucasus. This brigade played an important role in keeping order at Tiflis, capital of the nascent Georgian republic. The brigade was disbanded under the German pressure in June 1918. Most of its personnel joined the Polish 4th Rifle Division of General Lucjan Żeligowski in Odessa and then returned to Poland.

In 1920, Polish Minister of Foreign Affairs Stanisław Patek sent a message to Georgia, proposing an exchange of diplomatic representatives and improved relations. The Georgians, threatened by Russian revolutionary factions and by Turkey, enthusiastically accepted the proposal. Soon after, Polish Deputy Minister of Foreign Affairs Tytus Filipowicz visited Tbilisi with a diplomatic mission.

Plans for a Polish-Georgian military alliance were drafted to have included Polish aid (equipment and munitions) for the Georgian military. Before the treaty was ratified, the Red Army invaded Georgia. Deputy Minister Filipowicz (who had been named to be Polish ambassador to Georgia) was arrested in Baku, Azerbaijan, when the Red Army invaded that country about the same time. Polish personnel in Georgia, led by Wiktor Białobrzeski, managed to create a provisional consular office before Georgia was annexed by the Soviet Union in 1921.

Aftermath
After the Soviet invasion of Georgia, the good Polish-Georgian relations resulted in large-scale Georgian emigration to Poland. Among the Georgians who moved to Poland, were parents of general John Shalikashvili (the general himself was born in Warsaw). Poland aided Georgian pro-independence activists for many years. Several Georgian officers were enlisted in the Polish Army in the interbellum, with such names as Zakaria Bakradze, Alexandre Chkheidze, Ivane Kazbegi, Viktor Lomidze and Valerian Tevzadze. All Georgian officers were sharing the privileges of the military and enjoyed a good relationship with their Polish fellow officers.

See also
Międzymorze (Intermarum)
Prometheism
Polish–Romanian alliance
Polish–Ukrainian alliance
Georgians in Poland

Notes

References
 Wojciech Materski, "Polsko-gruziński sojusz wojskowy 1920" ("The 1920 Polish-Georgian Military Alliance"), in Andrzej Koryn, ed., Wojna polsko-sowiecka 1920 roku: przebieg walk i tło międzynarodowe: materiały sesji naukowej w Instytucie Historii PAN, 1-2 października 1990 (The 1920 Polish-Soviet War: Course and International Backdrop: Materials of a Conference at the Polish Academy of Sciences Institute of History, October 1–2, 1990), Wydawnictwo Instytutu Historii PAN (Publications of the Polish Academy of Sciences Institute of History), 1991, pp. 203–209.
Rukkas, Andriy (2001), "Georgian Servicemen in the Polish Armed Forces (1922–39)". The Journal of Slavic Military Studies, 1556-3006, Volume 14, Issue 3: 93–106

1920 in Georgia (country)
1920 in Poland
1921 in Georgia (country)
1921 in Poland
20th century in Georgia (country)
Military alliances involving Georgia (country)
Military alliances involving Poland
20th-century military alliances
1920 in international relations
Georgia (country)–Poland relations